Yakutat may refer to:

Geography
Yakutat, Alaska, a unified city-borough in Alaska
Yakutat Bay, a bay on the coast of Alaska
Yakutat Airport, a state-owned public-use airport in Alaska in the United States
Yakutat Army Airfield, a former United States Army airfield which was redeveloped into the current airport
Yakutat Colony, a former Russian penal colony on the U.S. National Register of Historic Places

Ships
 , a United States Navy seaplane tender in commission from 1944 to 1946
 , later WHEC-380, a United States Coast Guard cutter in commission from 1948 to 1971

Other uses
Yakutat Block, a fragment of the Earth's crust in the process of accreting to the North American continent along the south central coast of Alaska
Yakutat, a dialect of the Tlingit language